The Fondazione Luigi Einaudi onlus was created in Rome, Italy in 1962 on the initiative of Giovanni Malagodi, secretary of the Italian Liberal Party, and the party was for decades, despite their autonomy, useful cultural support.

The center is visited by a quarter of a million scholars, 15% from outside Turin, many from outside Italy. The foundation has relationships with the Colegio de México and Cornell University, facilitating research on regional integration, comparative models of employment and social policy, and contemporary political and economic thought.
In 1984 the statute was reformed by eliminating the presence of law of the secretary of the PLI by the governing board of the Foundation, in order to start a process totally independent, essentially aimed to study the new guidelines that faced in those years in Italy opening new horizons to the spread of liberal culture. Dissolved the PLI in 1993 in the collapse of the traditional parties, the Foundation has been to represent the continuity of liberal culture, suddenly claimed by many as an essential element of new and old political parties, few practiced in bipolar coalitions that have come affirming starting since 1994.

Even then, however, it appeared clear that the transition to the bipolar transversely cutting the Liberal membership; and in fact those who were (in and out of PLI) recognized in the membership, divided into the new system by choosing different political militancy, or none. In acknowledge it, the Einaudi Foundation in Rome has decided to maintain and even more so to strengthen their choice, not of neutrality but of impartiality: no neutrality because the Foundation has its foundation and orientation in the liberal culture, but of impartiality, because the liberal culture, for the same characteristics that distinguish it, it does not lead to predetermined party options.

The choice made by the Foundation is of greater importance in the present moment, despite the verbal statements, it is clear that the liberal culture is altogether a minority in the new political system, and thus requires initiatives and tools that help to make it grow, in what distinguished by other patently functional foundations in locations partisan and coalition. The way to do that, or at least try, is to constantly practiced by Einaudi Foundation: develop the debate and dialogue between different positions, present any problem to a rational analysis and motivated schematics without preconceptions, to offer to those who want a place of freedom discussion.
The choices of those who intend to take an active part in militant politics does not involve in any case the Foundation, returning them in the exercise of personal responsibility of each.

Library 
The library of the Luigi Einaudi Foundation in Rome is from the beginning of the foundation building block of its assets. It has gradually formed around the first collection of books donated as a bequest from Alberto Giovannini, Secretary of the Italian Liberal Party in 1923.

The library specializes in social sciences, modern and contemporary history and political economy, with particular reference to the history of the Liberal Party and the Italian political thought, economic and social liberal. It is updated with the latest Italian and foreign production, and in particular with English-language publications.
Since 2004, the library belongs to the national library system, Polo Capitoline, and its inventory is available at https://web.archive.org/web/20140816011924/http://opacapitolino.caspur.it/, selecting the Einaudi Foundation in the list of libraries aderenti.I volumes in the library are available on appointment by writing to http://www.fondazioneluigieinaudi.it/fondazione/contatti/

Hours: Monday to Thursday from 9.00 am to 18.00 - on Friday from 10.00 to 14.00

Access: Free (upon presentation of proof of identity)

Services: consultation on site, photocopying, bibliographic information.

Archives 
"The Historical Archives, which specializes in the recovery and enhancement, through research, studies and publications, the sources to the history of the Italian Liberal Party during the years of the Republic (1943-1993), has a significant documentary heritage consists primarily from the papers John Malagodi and his family and other liberal political funds that have carried out a decisive importance within the Italian liberal Party.
The historical funds, all declared of notable historical interest by the Archival Superintendency for Lazio, are divided into private funds of persons and private funds of party section.
The inventoried funds are available by appointment, by writing to presidente@fondazione-einaudi.it.
Hours: Monday to Thursday from 9.00 to 18.00 - on Friday from 10.00 to 14.00
At the Foundation are deposited the following archives:
inventoried and accessible Giovanni Malagodi funds
A short biography of John Malagodi, the complete inventory of the fund and a digitized selection of cards can be found at: 
Valerio Zanone - Fondazione Luigi Einaudi onlus website http://www.fondazioneluigieinaudi.it/commemorazione-valerio-zanone/
A brief biography of Valerio Zanone, the complete inventory of the fund and a digitized selection of cards can be found at:
Vittorio Zincone 
A brief biography of Vittorio Zincone, a complete inventory of the fund and a digitized selection of cards can be found at: Catalogues Archives of the twentieth century - Fondazione Luigi Einaudi onlus website www.fondazioneluigieinaudi.it
inventoried funds and consulted with paper inventory.

Conferences 
Seminars, Study Groups, and International Conferences cover economics, the history of thought, and foreign affairs.

Publications 
Publications include the Annals of the Foundation (Publicazioni della Fondazione Luigi Einaudi), a collection of  Studies (Studi), and a series on the classics of economic and political thought ("Scrittori di politica, economia e storia").

See also 
Fondazione Luigi Einaudi onlus website www.fondazioneluigieinaudi.it

Libraries in Rome
1962 in Italy
Libraries established in 1962